The Papatoetoe News was the first local newspaper serving the community of Papatoetoe, a suburb of Auckland, New Zealand. It appeared in 1936 and was owned by John Helleur. It was printed in Otahuhu. It was published on a fortnightly basis until it became a weekly in 1958 and ceased publication on 16 September 1964, when it was replaced by the Papatoetoe-Otara Gazette.

References 

Defunct newspapers published in New Zealand
Mass media in Auckland
Publications established in 1936
1936 establishments in New Zealand
Publications disestablished in 1964
1964 disestablishments in New Zealand